Talia Rahimi (Hebrew: טליה רחימי; born 1978) is an Israeli author, poet, teacher and linguist.

Biography 
Talia Rahimi was born in Rehovot. Her dream of writing began, in her words, when she was in third or fourth grade, when she wrote stories, which she dreamed of publishing one day, in a notebook which she called "Stories".

Rahimi has a degree in education, linguistics and English literature from Ben Gurion University.

Together with her friend, Efrat Marco, Rahimi established the "Ling" language school.

In 2010, she published her first book, "Pitsirika", intended for a youth audience.

In 2012, she published a children's book entitled "Zeor the Dinosaur" (Hebrew: זאור הדינוזאור).

Books 
 Pitsirika (Hakibbutz Hameuchad, 2010) - 
 Zeor the Dinosaur (Hakibbutz Hameuchad, 2012) -

References

External links 

 House call with Author Talia Rahimi 
 
 
  Itzik the Clown - Zeor the Dinosaur - Radio 103FM

1978 births
Living people
Israeli children's writers
Israeli Jews
People from Rehovot
Israeli educators
Israeli women educators
Jewish educators
Ben-Gurion University of the Negev alumni
21st-century Israeli women writers
Israeli women children's writers